Fernando José Lunar [loo-NAR] (born May 25, 1977), is a former Major League Baseball catcher who played for the Atlanta Braves (2000) and Baltimore Orioles (2000–02). He batted and threw right-handed. He played minor league baseball through 2007.

Career
On June 24, 2000, while playing for the Atlanta Braves against the Milwaukee Brewers, Lunar was called for receiving a pitch with his foot outside of the catcher's box.  A balk was assessed to pitcher Greg Maddux.  Such a call, known as a "catcher's balk", is rarely seen in baseball.

In a three-year major league career, Lunar was a .224 hitter with 22 RBI and no home runs in 97 games. He played for the Somerset Patriots in the Atlantic League in 2005 and 2006. He last appeared in the minor leagues with the Mississippi Braves, the Class AA affiliate of the Atlanta Braves, in 2007.

See also
 List of players from Venezuela in Major League Baseball

References

External links

1977 births
Living people
Atlanta Braves players
Baltimore Orioles players
Major League Baseball catchers
Major League Baseball players from Venezuela
People from Anzoátegui
Somerset Patriots players
Venezuelan expatriate baseball players in the United States